Nell Greenfieldboyce is an American radio journalist.  She is a science and technology reporter for National Public Radio (NPR) and lives in Washington, DC.

Education and career
Greenfieldboyce attended the Warren public schools and Watchung Hills Regional High School. She took part in summer schools run by the Center for Talented Youth at Johns Hopkins University. Graduating from high school one year early, she subsequently earned a Bachelor of Arts in social sciences (history of science with writing) and a Master of Arts in science writing from Johns Hopkins. She spent only three years as an undergraduate, while in her fourth year she received a journalism scholarship to continue on for a masters. As an undergraduate she interned at UPI and the Johns Hopkins University Medical School Public Relations Office, read copy for the student radio station, and was selected for Phi Beta Kappa. For her master's project, she traveled to Boston to interview Dr. Judah Folkman. Beginning in 1995, for a decade she wrote on science and technology in print media: Clinical Laboratory News, New Scientist, and U.S. News & World Report. She also taught at her alma mater. She received the 1998 Evert Clark/Seth Payne Award for Young Science Journalists.

References 

American women journalists
American reporters and correspondents
Johns Hopkins University alumni
Living people
NPR personalities
1974 births
American science journalists
People from Plainfield, New Jersey
21st-century American women